The 1979 Miami Redskins football team was an American football team that represented Miami University in the Mid-American Conference (MAC) during the 1979 NCAA Division I-A football season. In its second season under head coach Tom Reed, the team compiled a 6–5 record (3–4 against MAC opponents), finished in seventh place in the MAC, and outscored all opponents by a combined total of 223 to 142.

The team's statistical leaders included Chuck Hauck with 1,258 passing yards, Paul Drennan with 503 rushing yards, and Don Treadwell with 395 receiving yards.

Schedule

References

Miami
Miami RedHawks football seasons
Miami Redskins football